George Henry Bolan (April 30, 1897 – January 17, 1940) was an American professional football player who was a running back for four seasons for the Chicago Bears.

References

External links

1897 births
American football running backs
Chicago Bears players
Purdue Boilermakers football players
1940 deaths
Sportspeople from Lake Forest, Illinois
Players of American football from Illinois